Zangeneh-ye Sofla (also Romanized as Zangeneh-ye Soflá; also known as Zangeneh and Zangeneh-ye Pā’īn) is a village in Kamazan-e Olya Rural District, Zand District, Malayer County, Hamadan Province, Iran. At the 2006 census, its population was 366, in 102 families.

References 

Populated places in Malayer County